Hausmannite is a complex oxide, or a mixed oxide, of manganese containing both di- and tri-valent manganese. It belongs to the spinel group and forms tetragonal crystals. Hausmannite is a brown to black metallic mineral with Mohs hardness of 5.5 and a specific gravity of 4.8.

The type locality is Oehrenstock (Öhrenstock), Ilmenau, Thuringian Forest, Thuringia, Germany, where it was first described in 1813. Locations include Batesville, Arkansas, US; Ilfeld, Germany; Langban, Sweden; and the Ural Mountains, Russia. High quality samples have been found in South Africa and Namibia where it is associated with other manganese oxides, pyrolusite and psilomelane and the iron-manganese mineral bixbyite. Wilhelm Haidinger (1827) named it in honour of Johann Friedrich Ludwig Hausmann (1782–1859), Professor of Mineralogy, University of Göttingen, Germany.

Image gallery

References

Manganese(II,III) minerals
Spinel group
Tetragonal minerals
Minerals in space group 141